The Tauro Fútbol Club is a professional soccer club based in the district of Pedregal east of Panama City, Panama. It was founded on 22 September 1984 and has participated in the Panamanian Football League (LPF) since 1988. Its founder, Giancarlo Gronchi, was a fan of Juventus and for that reason the colours of the club and uniform are black and white. They have won thirteen championships between 1989 and 2017, making them the most successful club in the league.

Their traditional rival has been Plaza Amador, ever since the founding of the LPF, originally as the Asociación Nacional Pro Fútbol (ANAPROF), in 1988. Their meetings are known as the  "El Clásico" in Panama.

History

Tauro FC's origins date to 1984, when tannery owner Giancarlo Gronchi, an immigrant from Italy, decided to create an internal football league for his company.  From that came the idea of forming a company team.  At that time, there were leagues formed of teams representing various Panamanian companies, as well as leagues formed of teams from the various immigrant colonies in Panama.  Tauro competed in those leagues, as well as the Panamanian District League, from its founding on 22 September 1984 to 1988.

In 1988, Tauro joined six other teams in forming ANAPROF, Panama's first national professional league.  This was a significant turning point in Panamanian football, which at the time was a smaller soccer presence in the region.

Gronchi's favorite Italian team was Juventus, and in the honor of that Italian power, Tauro also competed in black and white striped jerseys. They club won its first title in 1989, and during the 1990s was the dominant team in Panamanian football.

What followed was the glory days of Tauro, which won championships in 1989, 1991, 1996–97, 1997–98, and 1999–2000.  Closely identified with the club's success in those years was Uruguayan Miguel Angel Mansilla, who managed the team on five occasions, interspersed with three stints managing Panama's national team.

Perhaps the most memorable title of that run came in 1996–97, when Patricio Guevara's 9th-minute goal lifted Tauro to a championship victory over the AFC Euro Kickers. That strike ended a five-year championship drought, and was followed by a repeat win over Deportivo Árabe Unido in 1997–98. The club won a fifth crown in 1999–2000, upsetting archrivals C.D. Plaza Amador.  Plaza Amador was favored because they had signed striker Víctor René Mendieta, widely considered one of the best players in Panamanian history.

Tauro has continued to win championships in the Apertura/Clausura era. In 2003, they swept the season under the direction of Colombian manager Gonzalo Soto. In Clausura 2006, they followed the leadership of ex-player Ruben Guevara to another crown.  In Apertura 2007, Mansilla returned to lead the club to a tenth championship (the fifth under his direction).

The club's tenth title came in Apertura 2010, under the leadership of Juan Carlos Cubillas.  The club has also won titles in Clausura 2012 and Apertura 2013, with titles coming under ex-players Sergio "Checho" Angulo and Rolando Palma.  In all, four former Bullfighters have won titles as both managers and players.

Club facts 
 Achievements at local level
 13 championships in first category of Panamanian football.
 Seasons in first division: 41
 Best position in the league: 1° (12 times)
 Sub-Championships: 8
 First gol: Carlos Maldonado (26/2/1988 vs Plaza Amador)
 First player ejected: José Alfredo Poyatos (26/2/1988)
 Achievements in international tournaments:
 Participations in the CONCACAF Champions League: 6

Rivalries
Tauro and Plaza Amador have been continuous rivals since ANAPROF started in 1988. Both teams are from Panama City itself, but do not play in the same stadium. The rivalry is referred to as "El Clásico" in Panama.

 Plaza Amador
 Árabe Unido
 San Francisco F.C.

New shield 

As current champions of the LPF in 2017, Tauro FC redesigned its club shield.

Honors 
Liga Panameña de Fútbol: 16(record)

1989, 1991, 1996–97, 1997–98, 1999–00, Apertura 2003, Clausura 2003, Clausura 2006, Apertura 2007, Apertura 2010, Clausura 2012, Apertura 2013, Clausura 2017, Clausura 2021
Runner-up (8): 1990, 1994–95, 1998–99, 2000–01, Clausura 2002, 2008 (A), 2008 (C), Apertura 2009, 2018 Apertura, 2019 Apertura

National League Finals

Players

Current squad 
As of 10 February, 2023.

Non-playing staff

Board of directors

Management hierarchy

Historical list of coaches 

 Christian Saborío (1988)
 Miguel Ángel Mansilla (1988–89)
 Miguel Ángel Mansilla (1991–93)
 José Andrade (1994)
 Miguel Ángel Mansilla (1994–99)
 José Alfredo Poyatos (2000)
 Gonzalo Soto (July 2002 – Apr 2004)
 José Alfredo Poyatos (Apr 2004–)
 Thomas Kempe (Jul 2006 – Oct 2006)
 Rubén Guevara (Oct 2006)
 Miguel Ángel Mansilla (2007–08)
 Gonzalo Soto (2008–10)
 Christian Saborío
 Juan Carlos Cubillas (April 2010 – Nov 11)
 Sergio Angulo (Dec 2011 – April 12)
 Gonzalo Soto (May 2012 – Nov 12)
 Rolando Palma (December 2012  – August 2014)
 Jorge Dely Valdés (Aug 2014 – Dec 14)
 José Alfredo Poyatos (Jan 2015 – March 15)
 Mike Stump (March 2015 – May 15)
 Jorge Dely Valdés (May 2015 – Oct 15)
 Rolando Palma (Oct 2015–Mar 2018)
 Sergio Angulo (Mar 2018–)
 Juan Carlos Garcia
 Saul Maldonado (September 2018 – August 2020)
 Rafael Mea Vitalli (August 2020 - November 2020)
 Javier Ainstein (November 2020 - December 2020)
 Julio Dely Valdés (December 2020 - May 2021)
 Enrique Kike Garcia (May 2021 - December 2021)
 Rolando Palma (December 2021 - Present)

International participations 

CONCACAF Champions League: 6 appearances
2008-09 : Group Stage
2010-11 : Preliminary Round
2011-12 : Group Stage
2012-13 : Group Stage
2014-15 : Group Stage
2018 : Quarter-finalsCONCACAF Champions' Cup:''' 4 appearances
1990 : First Round
1991 : Second Round
1992 : Third Round
1997 : First Round

References

External links
Official site
Non-Official site (Página realizada en su momento por el periodista panameño Adán De Gracia E.)
Tauro FC Page-ANAPROF Site

 
Football clubs in Panama
Association football clubs established in 1984
Panama City
1984 establishments in Panama